BreadTube or LeftTube is a loose and informal group of online content creators who create video content, including video essays and livestreams, from socialist, social democratic, communist, anarchist, and other left-wing perspectives. BreadTube creators generally post videos on YouTube that are discussed on other online platforms, such as Reddit.

BreadTube creators are known to participate in a form of "algorithmic hijacking". They will choose to focus on the same topics discussed by content creators with right-wing politics. This enables their videos to be recommended to the same audiences consuming right-wing or far-right videos, and thereby expose a wider audience to their perspectives. Many BreadTube content creators are funded through crowdfunding, and the channels often serve as introductions to left-wing politics for young viewers.

BreadTube creators align with collectivist modes of governance, while opposing liberalism, the alt-right, and the far-right. Infighting is common within the BreadTube community, which has been attributed to "the community host[ing] a spectrum of beliefs, ranging from Social Democratic to Maoist".

Origin

The term BreadTube comes from Peter Kropotkin's The Conquest of Bread, a book explaining how to achieve anarcho-communism and how an anarcho-communist society would function.

The BreadTube phenomenon itself does not have a clear origin, although many BreadTube channels started in an effort to combat anti-social justice warrior and alt-right content that gained traction in the mid-2010s. By 2018, these individual channels had formed an interconnected community. Two prominent early BreadTubers were Lindsay Ellis, who left Channel Awesome in 2015 to start her own channel in response to the Gamergate controversy, and Natalie Wynn, who started her channel ContraPoints in 2016 in response to the online dominance of the alt-right at the time. In an April 2021 interview, Wynn opined that "The alt-right, the manosphere, incels, even the so-called SJW Internet and LeftTube all have a genetic ancestor in New Atheism."

Format 
BreadTube videos frequently have a high production value, incorporating theatrical elements and running for longer than typical YouTube videos. Many are direct responses to right-wing talking points. Whereas right-wing and cyberlibertarian creators' videos are usually antagonistic towards their political opponents, BreadTubers seek to analyze and understand their opponents' arguments, often employing subversion, humor, and "seduction". Many aim to appeal to broad audiences, reaching people who do not already hold left-wing viewpoints rather than "preaching to the choir". Videos often do not end with a solid conclusion, instead encouraging viewers to come to their own conclusions from the referenced material. As BreadTube channels often cite left-wing and socialist texts to inform their arguments, this can act as an introduction to left-wing thought for their viewers.

Notable channels 

BreadTube content is in English and most BreadTubers come from the United States or the United Kingdom. The term is informal and often disputed, as there are no agreed-upon criteria for inclusion. According to The New Republic, in 2019, the five people most commonly mentioned as examples are ContraPoints, Lindsay Ellis, Hbomberguy, Philosophy Tube, and Shaun, while Kat Blaque and Anita Sarkeesian are cited as significant influences. Ian Danskin (aka Innuendo Studios), Hasan Piker, Vaush, and Destiny have also been described as part of BreadTube. Several of these people have rejected the label.

Reception 
According to The Conversation, as of 2021, BreadTube content creators "receive tens of millions of views a month and have been increasingly referenced in media and academia as a case study in deradicalisation." According to The Independent, BreadTube "commentators have been trying, quite successfully, to intervene in the right-wing recruitment narrative – lifting viewers out of the rabbit-hole, or, at least, shifting them over to a new one."

Black BreadTube content creator Kat Blaque has criticized the lack of black content creators within BreadTube and argues that Black content creators are marginalized within BreadTube. BreadTube content creator Kyle Kulinski argued that infighting within BreadTube has left the community "politically impotent and ineffectual."

Beatrice Steele of The Oxford Student criticized BreadTube for being "too marginal to make a real-world difference, despite its rich personalities and popular video essays." due to not "hav[ing] the intergenerational reach of channels like Fox News, or the Daily Wire's ability to rack up clicks on Facebook." Steele also argued that BreadTube "lacks the incendiary potential of cynicism."

See also
Deradicalization 
Alt-right pipeline

References 

2010s in Internet culture
2010s neologisms
Commentary YouTubers
Internet activists
Left-wing politics